The General Aviation Design Bureau T-2 Maverick is a Ukrainian ultralight trike, designed  and produced by the General Aviation Design Bureau of Ukraine, based in Kyiv. The aircraft is supplied as a complete ready-to-fly-aircraft.

Design and development
The T-2 was produced starting in 1995 as a trainer for western markets under subcontract, but is now sold under the General Aviation Design Bureau's own name.

The aircraft has a maximum gross weight of  depending on the version. It features a cable-braced hang glider-style high-wing, weight-shift controls, a two-seats-in-side-by-side configuration open cockpit with two separate cockpit fairings, tricycle landing gear and a single engine in pusher configuration.

The aircraft's structure is made from tubing, with its double surface wing covered in Dacron sailcloth. Its  span wing is supported by a single tube-type kingpost and uses an "A" frame weight-shift control bar. Powerplants available are the twin cylinder, air-cooled, two-stroke, dual-ignition  Rotax 503 engine, the liquid-cooled  Rotax 582 engine or the four cylinder, air and liquid-cooled, four-stroke, dual-ignition  Rotax 912UL engine.

Specifications (T-2 with Maverick II wing)

References

1990s Ukrainian sport aircraft
1990s Ukrainian ultralight aircraft
Single-engined pusher aircraft
Ultralight trikes